Mario Kelentrić (born 30 January 1973) is a Croatian former handball player who played as a goalkeeper, and is currently the goalkeeping coach of the Bosnia and Herzegovina national team. 

He has played for clubs in Croatia, Slovenia, Germany and France.

He is noted as being one of the best goalkeepers of Croatia and he was also part of the golden generation witch won the 2003 World Championship in Portugal.

Career
In 1993 Kelentrić signed with RK Medveščak Zagreb. In his first season with the club he reached the final of the Croatian Cup. During his seven-year stay he reached two more cup finals and was in the top flight for most of his time spent there.

In 1999 he moved to Badel 1862 Zagreb. In his first season with the club he reached the semi-final of the EHF Champions League and won both domestic titles. In 2001 he moved to Pivovara Laško Celje and unfortunately was part of a team that lost the domestic title for the first time since the inception of the Slovenian League.

In 2002 he moved to Metković Jambo but he stayed at the club for only half a season leaving in January 2003 to return to RK Zagreb. In 2004 he left for Germany signing with TUSEM Essen with whom he won the EHF Cup.

Later he had short stints with RK Agram Medveščak and Saint-Marcel Vernon before moving to MT Melsungen where he played for six years. While there he took part in HBL All-Star Game 2009.

He finally retired in 2013 in RK Zagreb.

International career
He appeared for the national team from 1997 to 2004 making 86 appearances notably sporting the jersey number 1.

He played at 1997 Mediterranean Games, 1998 European Championship, 1999 World Championship, 1999 Super Cup, 2001 World Championship, 2001 Mediterranean Games, 2002 European Championship, 2003 World Championship and at the 2004 European Championship.

After the 2004 European Championship national team head coach Lino Červar never called up Kelentrić to play for the national team even though he was the best goalkeeper in Croatia at the time.

Kelentrić has stated numerous time since that he hates Červar for not calling him up for the 2004 Summer Olympics and that he will never forgive him for that.

Honours
Medveščak
Croatian Cup
Finalist (3): 1994, 1999, 2006
Limburgse Handbal Dagen
Winner (1): 1993

Zagreb
Croatian First A League/First League/Premier League 
Winner (5): 1999-2000, 2000-01, 2002-03, 2003-04, 2012-13
Croatian Cup
Winner (4): 2000, 2003, 2004, 2013
SEHA League
Winner (1): 2012-13

Celje
Slovenian First League
Runner-up (1): 2001-02
Slovenian Cup
Finalist (1): 2002

Essen
EHF Cup
Winner (1): 2005

Individual
2003 Athletes of the Year - Most Successful Men's Team by: COC

References

External links
Eurohandball profile

1973 births
Living people
People from Gradačac
Croats of Bosnia and Herzegovina
Croatian male handball players
RK Zagreb players
Handball players from Zagreb
Croatian expatriate sportspeople in Slovenia
Croatian expatriate sportspeople in Germany
Croatian expatriate sportspeople in France
Mediterranean Games gold medalists for Croatia
Mediterranean Games medalists in handball
Competitors at the 1997 Mediterranean Games
Competitors at the 2001 Mediterranean Games
20th-century Croatian people
21st-century Croatian people